Psydrax ficiformis is a species of flowering plant in the family Rubiaceae. It is endemic to southern India.

References

External links
World Checklist of Rubiaceae

ficiformis
Endemic flora of India (region)
Endangered plants
Taxonomy articles created by Polbot
Taxa named by Diane Mary Bridson
Taxa named by Joseph Dalton Hooker